Fossickers Way is a series of country roads located in the Northern Tablelands region of New South Wales, Australia that form a  scenic and tourist drive. The road's southern terminus is located in Nundle with its northwest terminus in Warialda; thereafter the road joins the Gwydir Highway and heads east to Inverell before reaching its eastern terminus in Glen Innes; The name refers to a tourist route overlaid on existing roads, and is not an officially gazetted one. The majority of the Fossickers Way is designated route B95.

The scenic route draws its name of Fossickers Way due to the many deposits of gold and the variety of gemstones that have been found in the area (mostly by Europeans) since the early 1850s. Prior to this time, local Aboriginal tribes such as the Werawai people of Nundle and its surrounds were known to use local minerals and stones for the purpose of making tools, such as axe heads.

Route
Fossickers Way transverses the western slopes of the Northern Tablelands and passes through some of the world’s richest gem areas. In these parts, sapphires, zircon, jasper, prase, rhodonite, crystals and even gold may be found. The highway passes through open wheat and grazing lands and deeply wooded slopes, through country towns rich in gold rush history.

Fossickers Way starts at the intersection of River and Nundle Roads in Nundle, and continues in a north-westerly course along Nundle Road via Dungowan to meet New England Highway at Nemingha, then travels northeast along New England Highway to Tamworth. It then proceeds in a northerly direction along Manilla Road via Manilla to Barraba, continues north as Cobbadah Road via Cobbadah to Bingara, and continues north as Alan Cunningham Road to the intersection with Gwydir Highway just west of Warialda. It then proceeds east along Gwydir Highway through Warialda via Inverell to finish at Glen Innes. As a scenic drive that incorporates seven shires in northern NSW, Fossickers Way acts as an alternate route between Sydney and Brisbane.

In this area, sapphires, zircon, jasper, prase, ridonite, crystals and even gold may be found along various quarries, rivers and creeks, such as Swamp Oak Creek, just out of the town of Nundle where gold was discovered in 1851 by a local squatter, Nathan Burrows  It has been reported that he made the discovery, then immediately informed folks in nearby Tamworth and the gold rush began thereafter. Gwydir Highway passes through open wheat and grazing lands and deeply wooded slopes through country towns, rich in gold rush history.

History
The passing of the Main Roads Act of 1924 through the Parliament of New South Wales provided for the declaration of Main Roads, roads partially funded by the State government through the Main Roads Board (later the Department of Main Roads, and eventually Transport for NSW). Main Road No. 63 was declared along this road from the intersection with Great Northern Highway (today New England Highway) at Tamworth, via Manilla and Bingara to Warialda (and continuing northwards via Yetman and Boggabilla eventually to the border with Queensland at Goondiwindi), and Main Road No. 105 from Nundle to the intersection with Great Northern Highway, today New England Highway, at Tamworth (and continuing southwards via Glenrock to Scone) on the same day, on 8 August 1928. With the passing of the Main Roads (Amendment) Act of 1929 to provide for additional declarations of State Highways and Trunk Roads, these were amended to Trunk Road 63 and Main Road 105 on 8 April 1929.

The Department of Main Roads, which had succeeded the MRB in 1932, truncated the northern end of Trunk Road 63 to Yetman when State Highway 16 (later named Bruxner Highway) was declared on 16 March 1938, subsuming the former alignment from Yetman via Boggabilla to the state border with Queensland at Goondiwindi.

The passing of the Roads Act of 1993 updated road classifications and the way they could be declared within New South Wales. Under this act, the route today retains its declaration as Main Roads 63 and 105, from Nundle to Nemingha, then from Tamworth to Warialda.

Fossickers Way was signed State Route 95 between Tamworth and Warialda in 1974. With the conversion to the newer alphanumeric system in 2013, this was replaced with route B95.

Tourism
Many events occur along Fossickers Way throughout the year, including the annual Tamworth Country Music Festival in January. The  Fossicker's Way Treasure Hunt is also an annual event which takes participants through all eight towns on the trail.

Major junctions

See also

List of highways in New South Wales

References

Highways in New South Wales